Savageton is an unincorporated community in Campbell County, Wyoming, United States.

References

Unincorporated communities in Wyoming
Unincorporated communities in Campbell County, Wyoming